Hamideh Abbasali (also Romanized as "Hamīdeh ’Abbās’alī"; born 14 March 1990 in Rey) is an Iranian karateka.

She achieved silver medal in final game of world karate championships 2014 held in Bremen, Germany against Shima Abouzeyd from Egypt in kumite +68 category.
In 2016, she attended world karate championships 2016, which were held in Linz Austria, and she won bronze medal.
At Islamic Solidarity Games in 
palembang kunite +68 she won a gold medal

Abbasali competed at the postponed 2020 Summer Olympics. She competed in the women's +61 kg event.

References

External links 
 
 
 WKF CURRENT RANKING - CATEGORIES - Female Kumite 68+ kg

1990 births
Living people
Iranian female karateka
Asian Games gold medalists for Iran
Asian Games bronze medalists for Iran
Asian Games medalists in karate
Karateka at the 2010 Asian Games
Karateka at the 2014 Asian Games
Karateka at the 2018 Asian Games
Medalists at the 2014 Asian Games
Medalists at the 2018 Asian Games
World Games silver medalists
Competitors at the 2017 World Games
World Games medalists in karate
Karateka at the 2020 Summer Olympics
Olympic karateka of Iran
People from Ray, Iran
21st-century Iranian women
Islamic Solidarity Games competitors for Iran